Brett Warton (born 4 June 1975) is an Australian former professional rugby league footballer who played in the 1990s and 2000s for the Western Suburbs Magpies in the National Rugby League (NRL) and the London Broncos in the English Super League. His preferred position was fullback.

Background
Brett Warton was born in Brisbane, Queensland, Australia.

References

External links
London Broncos profile
Statistics at slstats.org
Statistics at rugbyleagueproject.com

1975 births
Australian rugby league players
Living people
London Broncos players
Western Suburbs Magpies players
Rugby league players from Brisbane
Rugby league fullbacks
Rugby league wingers